The Ricoh WG-20 is a digital compact camera announced by Ricoh on February 5, 2014. It replaces the Pentax WG-10 and is rated as "waterproof to 33 feet, shockproof from drops of up to five feet, coldproof to 14 degrees Fahrenheit and crushproof, withstanding up to 220 foot-pounds of force" by its manufacturer.

References

http://www.dpreview.com/products/ricoh/compacts/ricoh_wg20/specifications

WG-20
Cameras introduced in 2014